Arthropeas americana is a species of fly in the family Xylophagidae.

Distribution
Canada, United States.

References

Further reading

 

Xylophagidae
Taxa named by Hermann Loew
Insects described in 1861
Diptera of North America